Ngam, or Sara Ngam, is a Bongo–Bagirmi language of Chad and the Central African Republic.

Examples 
 Sú àl̄ dò̰ó̰ bə̄ kà̰ŗ̄ɓày ᵼ̀sō-nìí jī Tùbòjēmgᵼ̄ tᵼ́. - He mounts (into a tree), but a toad falls into the hands of Toubojemgué.
 J-àw̄ ndò̰ kānjᵼ̄-á bā-á. - We went fishing on the river.
 ń-dòó dá, ā í-ɗāhā ɗí tā? - And now what are you going to do?
 Wòjᵼ̀ ngán gᵼ̄ sīrí, àdᵼ̄ ngán kᵼ́ dìngà ??gᵼ̄ ??ì mᵼ̀tá, bə̄ kᵼ́ dḭ̀yá̰ gᵼ̄ ì sɔ́. - He has seven children, three boys and four girls.
 Mbɔ̀ŗ̄ nᵼ̀ngà yā̰-í ngāl ànī, à ᵼ̀ndà yḛ̄tᵼ̄ gᵼ̄ ᵼ̀gà dɔ̀-í tᵼ́. - If the handle of your spear is long, it will strike the wasps that will sting you.
 ó̰-ō̰, ḿ-gèŗ̄ àĺ tó̰ò̰. - No, I do not understand yet.
 Yèl̄ gᵼ̄ ní ɗèē wɔ̀tᵼ̄-n̄ dɔ̀-ǹ tᵼ́ - The birds arrive above his head.

References

Bongo–Bagirmi languages